Figgie Hobbin: Poems for Children is a children's poetry collection written by the Cornish poet Charles Causley and first published in 1970. Since then it has gone through numerous reprints, including a notable version published in the United States in 1973, with illustrations by Trina Schart Hyman. It is dedicated to the artist Stanley Simmonds and his wife Cynthia.

The poems' subjects are fairly evenly split between gentle introspection and delighting in random nonsense. The poem from which the book gets its title speaks of the old King of Cornwall, tempted with all sorts of exotic dishes, who petulantly tells his servants to take it all away and bring him what he really wants—a humble dish of figgie hobbin. (Figgy hobbin:- plain pastry, cooked with a handful of raisins (raisins being "figs" and figs "broad raisins").

Poems
Note: the following poems are printed in the U.S. edition of the book.  The U.K. edition may contain a slightly different collection of poems.

I saw a jolly hunter
A fox came into my garden
'Quack!' said the billy goat
Colonel Fazackerley
Tell me, tell me, Sarah Jane
As I went down Zig Zag
Logs of wood
Old Mrs. Thing-um-e-bob
King Foo Foo
Riley
At nine of the night I opened my door
My mother saw a dancing bear
Figgie Hobbin

References

External links

1970 children's books
1970 poetry books
Children's poetry books
English poetry collections
British children's books